Eckelrade is a village in the Dutch province of Limburg. It is part of the municipality of Eijsden-Margraten, and situated about 8 km southeast of the town of Maastricht.

Traditions
This village holds a yearly contest in cherry stone spitting.  Spectators are used to bringing an umbrella, when they visit the battlefield.

This village is one of the few that has been part of four municipalities at the same time and later one of two. (Until 1828 parts of it belonged to Gronsveld, to Breust, to Rijckholt and to Valkenburg. From 1828 until 1982 it was part of Sint Geertruid and of Gronsveld, whereas in the last mentioned year it completely became part of Margraten). But it is said that before 1828 a criminal could easily avoid apprehension by simply crossing the street, as there was little or no juridical co-ordination between the several municipalities the village then partly belonged to.

Gallery

References

Populated places in Limburg (Netherlands)
Eijsden-Margraten